E3 ubiquitin-protein ligase MARCH6 is an enzyme that in humans is encoded by the MARCH6 gene.

Gene name error in Excel 

Like the other MARCH and septin genes, care must be exercised when analyzing genetic data containing the MARCH6 gene in Microsoft Excel. This is due to Excel's autocorrect feature treating the text "MARCH6" as a date and converting it to a standard date format. The original text cannot be recovered as a result of the conversion. A 2016 study found up to 19.6% of all papers in selected journals to be affected by the gene name error. The issue can be prevented by using an alias name (such as MARCHF6), prepending with an apostrophe ('), or preformatting the cell as text.

See also

List of EC numbers (EC 3)

References

Further reading

External links